was a Japanese photographer.

Almost nothing about Moriwaki is known. In the 1930s he was a member of the Osaka Camera Group ( Ōsaka Kamera Gurūpu) of Kiyoshi Koishi, and in the late thirties a member of Rōka Photography Club ( Rōka Shashin Kurabu).

The Tokyo Metropolitan Museum of Photography holds works by Moriwaki in its permanent collection.

Notes

References
Nihon no shashinka / Biographic Dictionary of Japanese Photography. Tokyo: Nichigai Associates, 2005. . P.407.  Despite the English-language alternative title, all in Japanese.
Nihon shashinka jiten / 328 Outstanding Japanese Photographers. Kyoto: Tankōsha, 2000. . P.309.  Despite the English-language alternative title, all in Japanese.

Japanese photographers
Year of birth missing
Possibly living people